Walter v Alberta (AG), [1969] S.C.R. 383 is a famous decision of the Supreme Court of Canada. The Court upheld the Albertan provincial Communal Properties Act of 1955, which among other things, restricted the amount of land that could be owned by Hutterites and Doukhobors. The Act required that those wishing to use land for communal colonies must first obtain the permission of the provincial government. It was intended to restrict communal use of land, but had the effect of discriminating against religious groups.

Paul Walter, not a Hutterite, wished to sell his land to a group of Hutterites and was prevented from doing so by the Communal Properties Act.
The plaintiffs argued that the Act was "colourable" legislation (i.e. law that had a hidden purpose), and that its true purpose concerned freedom of religion, which is a matter within the exclusive jurisdiction of the federal government.

The Court unanimously upheld the Act. The pith and substance of the Act, the Court said, related to land ownership in Alberta. Accordingly, property within the province was a valid matter of provincial jurisdiction, even though it had an incidental effect on religion.

See also
 List of Supreme Court of Canada cases (Richards Court through Fauteux Court)

External links
 Communal Properties Act

References

Canadian federalism case law
Supreme Court of Canada cases
Supreme Court of Canada case articles without infoboxes
1969 in Canadian case law
Christianity and law in the 20th century
Canadian property case law
Hutterites in Canada
Doukhobors
Communalism
Canadian freedom of religion case law
Christianity in Alberta
Alberta litigation
1969 in Alberta